Area Boys is a short Nigerian film released in 2007 in Nigeria and the UK, starring Eddie Kadi, Akeem Olatunbosun, Dele Awosile, Janet-Nicole Nzekwe and directed by Omelihu Nwanguma under Inspire Film & Media.

Synopsis 
Friends, Bode and Obi, are born and grow up in a world where corruption and greed override all else.  They decide to cut ties with their boss because they want to establish their own business partnership to better fend against the corruption surrounding them.  But their plans leak out before they begin when they plot to move against Charles Darwin and he finds out about it.  Fleeing the city and Darwin, the pair discover the true value of friendship.

Prizes 
 2018 Sony Film Festival

References

External links

 

2007 films
Nigerian drama films
2007 short films
British drama films
2000s British films